Lieutenant-General  Syed Wajid Hussain  HI(M), AC is a retired Pakistani army general who served as the Chairman of Heavy Industries Taxila.

References

Living people
Pakistani generals
Year of birth missing (living people)